Biropristis is an extinct genus of sawfish-like shark from the Late Cretaceous epoch of the Cretaceous period. The genus is named in honor of  Dr. Lajos Biró-Bagózcky who studied the formation in which it was found. It is known from a single species, B. landbecki. It is known solely from isolated oral teeth found in the Maastrichtian-aged Quiriquina Formation of central Chile. The species is named for Luis Landbeck who found the first fossils at the locality in which it was found.

References

Prehistoric cartilaginous fish genera
Sclerorhynchidae